Lisa Pelikan is an American stage, film, and television actress. Born in Berkeley, California, Pelikan studied drama at the Juilliard School on a full scholarship. She subsequently made her Broadway debut in a 1977 production of Romeo and Juliet. The same year, she appeared as the younger version of Vanessa Redgrave's title character in the film Julia. She subsequently starred in the horror film Jennifer (1978). Her other film credits include Ghoulies (1985) and Return to the Blue Lagoon (1991).

Life and career

Early life
Pelikan was born in Berkeley, California, the daughter of Helen L., a psychologist, and Robert G. Pelikan, an international economist who served as the minister-counselor from the United States at the Organisation for Economic Co-operation and Development in Paris. She is of Czech descent. At age six, Pelikan was diagnosed with a bone tumor in her leg, which was treated with surgery.

Due to her father's work, Pelikan spent her childhood in several different countries, including France, Japan, and Italy, before returning to the United States when she was a teenager, settling in Bethesda, Maryland. While attending high school in Maryland, Pelikan took an interest in ballet, but was unable to pursue it after the tumor in her leg recurred, requiring a second surgery that left her unable to walk for the entirety of her senior year of high school.

Acting career
Pelikan shifted her focus to acting, and attended the Juilliard School in New York City with a full scholarship to its drama division. Her first regular television work was as maid Kate Mahaffey on the CBS soap opera Beacon Hill (1975). After, she made her Broadway debut as Rosaline in a 1977 production of Romeo and Juliet.

Pelikan had her feature film debut as the younger version of Vanessa Redgrave's title character in the drama Julia (1977). Pelikan portrayed the title character of the horror film Jennifer (1978), starring opposite Nina Foch and John Gavin, and subsequently appeared as the lusty Lucy Scanlon in the television miniseries Studs Lonigan (1979), co-starring with Harry Hamlin, Colleen Dewhurst, and Brad Dourif.

Pelikan was married to actor Robert Harper from 1981 to 1984. In 1984, she had a supporting role in Jonathan Demme's Swing Shift, starring Goldie Hawn and Kurt Russell. She subsequently married actor Bruce Davison in 1986, and had one son, Ethan, born in 1996. Pelikan appeared in a leading role in the horror film Ghoulies (1985), and starred as the widowed mother Sarah Hargrave in the film sequel Return to the Blue Lagoon (1991).

She won a Drama-Logue Award for her role in a Los Angeles-based production of Only a Broken String of Pearls (1995), a one-woman play about Zelda Fitzgerald by Willard Simms. In 1998, she had a minor part in the thriller film Shadow of Doubt.

In 2006, Pelikan and Davison divorced after 20 years of marriage. In 2018, Pelikan earned a Master of Fine Arts degree in acting from California State University, Long Beach. She currently teaches Acting with the Camera at HB Studio in New York City.

Filmography

Film

Television

Stage credits

References

External links

 
 
 
 Official site

Actresses from Berkeley, California
American film actresses
American people of Czech descent
American Shakespearean actresses
American soap opera actresses
American stage actresses
American theatre directors
Women theatre directors
Living people
Juilliard School alumni
California State University, Long Beach alumni
Year of birth missing (living people)